Mouriri gleasoniana is a species of plant in the family Melastomataceae. It is found in Mexico and Panama.

References

gleasoniana
Least concern plants
Taxonomy articles created by Polbot